Dharam Singh (born 30 October 1937) is an Indian field hockey player. He competed in the men's tournament at the 1964 Summer Olympics, and was part of team that won the gold medal.

References

External links
 

1937 births
Living people
Indian male field hockey players
Olympic field hockey players of India
Field hockey players at the 1964 Summer Olympics
Olympic gold medalists for India
Olympic medalists in field hockey
Medalists at the 1964 Summer Olympics
Asian Games gold medalists for India
Medalists at the 1966 Asian Games
Asian Games medalists in field hockey
Field hockey players at the 1966 Asian Games
Field hockey players from Punjab, India